Five Points is an unincorporated community in Fresno County, California.

A post office opened at Five Points in 1944.

References

Unincorporated communities in California
Unincorporated communities in Fresno County, California